Condensed aerosol fire suppression is a particle-based method of fire extinction. It is similar to but not identical to dry chemical fire extinction methods.

Description
Condensed aerosol fire suppression employs a fire-extinguishing agent consisting of very fine solid particles, as well as gaseous matter. The condensed aerosol microparticles and effluent gases are generated by an exothermic reaction;  the particles remain in vapor state during the process of being generated within the device. Then, the extinguishing  material is "condensed" and cooled within the device, and discharged as solid particles.

Compared to gaseous suppressants (which emit only gas) and dry chemical suppression agents (which are powder-like particles of a large size – 25–150 micrometers), the National Fire Protection Association defines condensed aerosols as those that release finely divided solids of less than 10 micrometers in diameter. 

The solid particulates have a considerably smaller mass median aerodynamic diameter (MMAD) than those of dry chemical suppression agents. The particulates also remain airborne significantly longer and leave much less residue within the protected area. 

Condensed aerosols are flooding agents. They are effective regardless of the location and height of the fire. This can be contrasted with dry chemical systems, which must be directly aimed at the flame. 

The condensed aerosol agent can be delivered by means of mechanical operation, electric operation, or combined electro-mechanical operation.

Wet chemical systems generally found in foam extinguishers must, similarly to dry chemical systems, be sprayed directionally onto the fire.

Methods of fire extinction

Condensed aerosol suppressants, as with gaseous suppressants, use four methods to extinguish fires. 

They act on the four elements of what is known as the "fire tetrahedron:" the disparate components that combine to create the chemical reaction underlying any fire. 

These four means of fire extinction are:

 Reduction or isolation of fuel
 Reduction or isolation of oxygen
 Reduction of heat
 Inhibiting the chain reaction of the above components

Condensed aerosols' primary extinguishing mechanism involves the fourth element of the fire tetrahedron by means of chemical reactions with the free radicals of the flame, therefore interfering with the combustion process of the fire. Typically, condensed aerosol particulates consist of potassium carbonate (K2CO3)) that are produced from the thermal decomposition of a solid aerosol-forming compound that includes potassium nitrate as an oxidizer. As the aerosol particles surround and come into contact with the flame, the particulates absorb the flame heat energy, breaking down and releasing large concentrations of potassium radicals (K+) (ions with an unpaired electron). The potassium radicals bond with the hydroxide (OH+), hydrogen (H+) and oxygen (O+) free radicals that sustain combustion, producing harmless by-product molecules like potassium hydroxide (KOH) and water (H2O).

K• + OH• = KOH

KOH + H• = K• + H2O

The potassium radicals are propagated since they are both consumed and produced by reaction with the fire radicals. Disrupting the reactions necessary to sustain the flame's combustion, the cycle continues until the combustion's chain reactions are terminated and the flame is extinguished. 

Condensed aerosol agents also have secondary extinguishing mechanisms implicating the other three elements of the fire tetrahedron described above. The aerosol cools the flame by engulfing it with a cloud with large concentrations of microparticles with  a mass median aerodynamic diameter (MMAD). There are as small as 1 to 2 micrometers.  Though the surface area of each microparticle is extremely small, the large quantity of particles surrounding and penetrating the flame offers a sufficiently large combined surface area to absorb the flame's heat.
On the surface of the particles, recombination of the fire radicals takes place as energy is absorbed:

O• + H• = OH•

H• + OH• = H2O

Flame is the gaseous part of a fire resulting from the combustion of fuel.  Aerosols particles and gases mixing with the gaseous components of the flame isolate the fire's fuel.

Attacking all the elements of the fire tetrahedron, condensed aerosol fire suppression agents are among the more effective flame-extinguishing agents. For example, some condensed aerosol fire suppressants can extinguish a Class B flammable liquid pool fire with 1/5 the amount of Halon 1301 agent or 1/10 the amount of a hydrofluorocarbon or fluoroketone based clean agent gaseous fire suppression system, in terms of kilogram mass of agent per cubic meter.

Performance

The extinguishing performance of condensed aerosol fire suppressants is dependent on the density of aerosol particulates in the immediate vicinity of the flame. As with gaseous fire suppression systems, the faster the agent can build around the flame, the more efficient the extinguishing agent is at stopping combustion.  The extinguishing and design densities of aerosol fire suppression agents are generally expressed in kilograms per cubic meter (kg/m3). Thus, the efficiency of aerosol extinguishing agents varies depending on a number of factors, such as the location of the aerosol relative to the flame, the proximity of other combustible flammable materials, the type of fuel involved, etc. 

Condensed aerosol devices are designed to provide a controlled discharge. The aerosol-forming compound is installed inside of the device, which is then fitted with an electric or mechanical initiator. The electric initiator is interfaced with a fire-detection control unit or panel, which can be remotely operated by physical means such as by cable, operated by hand with a fuse mechanism such as those used in smoke dispensing grenades, or automatic and self-triggering when outfitted with an integral heat-sensing device.

Uses and applications
There are two uses for applying fire extinguishing agents: as a total flooding fire protection system or as a local application fire-suppression system.

To provide total flooding fire suppression, the total quantity of aerosol required to extinguish a fire inside of fixed space must be determined. The corresponding number of aerosol devices that would collectively discharge the aerosol quantity required are then mounted, typically on the ceiling or wall. Aerosol devices equipped with electric initiators are interconnected and relayed by a fire alarm control panel. Because the aerosol devices are self-contained and function as both a storage container and as a nozzle that propels the gas, no distribution network is required to transport or distribute the fire-extinguishing agent from a remote storage location, resulting in floor space savings and transportation efficiency gains.

Local-application fire suppression is typically applied by a handheld portable device tossed directly toward the fire. Unlike streaming portable fire extinguishing units, the operators are not required to place themselves at risk by approaching the fire while applying the extinguishing agent directly at the flames. The portable condensed aerosol device is typically designed to disperse aerosol in a 360° spray pattern, forming a large aerosol cloud around the vicinity of the fire.  The aerosol immediately reduces the flames as its particles approach the fire and generate flame-neutralizing potassium radicals. 

The flames are suppressed as long as the aerosol retains sufficient density. If the aerosol fails to achieve sufficient density to extinguish the fire, it still suppresses the fire, which retains significantly lower heat.  This offers firefighters, for instance, a tool to bring down flames to a manageable heat level and reduce room temperatures while the hose team enters the burning area. As another example, first responders can deploy condensed aerosols within an enclosed area to suppress fires while evacuating occupants to safety.

Condensed aerosol systems are suitable for special hazards applications as replacements for Halon 1301 systems and high-pressure carbon dioxide systems. Aerosol systems can also be used as alternatives to clean agent gaseous suppressants or water-mist systems.

Environmental issues
The United States Environmental Protection Agency has approved condensed aerosol fire suppression systems as acceptable substitutes for Halon 1301 in total flooding systems. Aerosol extinguishers are also non-ozone depleting and carry little or no global warming potential.

Safety concerns and incidents

On March 13, 2016, eight people were killed and seven injured when an aerosol system false activated in a bank vault. Claims in the news were that the system depleted oxygen, whereas the manufacturer states that the system does not displace oxygen.

On November 15, 2019, one person was killed on board a fishing vessel in the UK when a condensed aerosol fire suppression system was inadvertently activated during installation. This event is still being investigated so the exact cause of the fatality is still unknown.

See also
Automatic fire suppression
Fire extinguisher
Fire protection engineering

References

Further reading
UL2775 Scope, Fixed Condensed Aerosol Extinguishing System Units
UL FWSA Guide, Fixed Condensed Aerosol Extinguishing System Units
Agafonov V., et al. 2004. The Mechanism of Fire Suppression by Condensed Aerosols. "Proceedings of the 15th HOTC." NIST, pp 984–993.
Dwyer, David J. 2011. Improved firefighting system Is on the way. "The Surf Rider," 14–15: 2001-01-28.
Kibert, Charles J. and Dierdorf, Douglas. 1993. Encapsulated Micron Aerosol Agents (EMMA). Halon Alternatives Technical Conference, 1993. NIST. May 11–13, 1993, pp 421–435
Halon Alternatives for the Ship-to-Shore Connector. Spectra, 12: 2001 
Fleming, James W., Williams, Bradley A. and Sheinson, Ronald S. 2002. Suppression Effectiveness of Aerosols: The Effect of Size and Flame Type. NIST SP984-4. National Institute of Standards and Technology

External links 
European Committee for Standardization, Fixed fire fighting systems
International Organization for Standardization, Condensed aerosol fire extinguishing systems 

Fire suppression